In Front of Yorktown is an oil painting of 1862–1863 by Winslow Homer. It depicts men from McClellan's Army of the Potomac, before the Siege of Yorktown.

It is also known as Camp Near Yorktown, A Camp Scene, and possibly as On the Picket Line.

The painting is in the collection of the Yale University Art Gallery.

References 

Paintings by Winslow Homer
1863 paintings